Dr Rodrigo González or Gonzalvo de la Puebla (c. 1450 – April 1509) was a 15th century Spanish lawyer and diplomat, best known for his work as Spanish ambassador to England. He spent a total of eighteen years in England (1487–1492 and 1495–1508) and so he, Gonzalo de Beteta and Gonzalo Fernández de Heredia (both ambassadors to the papal court) are held to have been newly-unified Spain's first permanent ambassadors.

Life

Early life and first embassy
Thought to have been from a modest artisan family and possible a converso, he was born in Toledo to Juan González de la Puebla. He studied law and received a doctorate in both civil and religious law. He gained renown as an accommodating, versatile, parsimonious and methodical lawyer, enabling him to become mayor and then magistrate of Écija, then counsellor of Castile and finally ambassador to England in 1487. His main role on arrival in London was to negotiate Catherine of Aragon's marriage to Arthur, Prince of Wales, the Spanish monarchs' youngest daughter of Ferdinand II of Aragon and Isabella I of Castile and the eldest son of Henry VII of England respectively.

Catherine was then only aged two, but an early betrothal formed part of the Spanish royal family's long-term plan for a solid alliance with England. Negotiations proved successful, culminating in the Treaty of Medina del Campo on 27 March 1489 and the return to Spain of Diego de Guevara and Juan de Sepúlveda, who had come to London with de la Puebla. Basing himself in an Augustinian monastery and later near the Strand, de la Puebla was also sent instructions from Ferdinand to negotiate an alliance with James IV of Scotland and arrange for a marriage between that king and Joanna of Aragon (1455–1501), illegitimate daughter of Don Fernando. The alliance was arranged, though the marriage did not occur.

Though he proved a successful ambassador to England, he gained a reputation as both greedy and stingy, with accusations that he lived in poor housing and even skimped on paying for food, preferring instead to be invited to dine at the English royal court. This gained him the enmity of Spanish merchants active in England, who denounced him to his royal masters. Negative reports also reached them from de Puebla's colleagues Sancho de Londoño and the Dominican brother Tomás de Matienzo. His monthly salary was only 25 ducats and even at his death he had debts, though there were also more serious allegations of being the 'servant of two masters' and holding dubious political allegiances.

Second embassy
He was recalled to Spain in 1492 to become ambassador to Catharine and John of Navarre, a role he held until 1494. He arrived back in London in mid 1495, this time to negotiate an alliance between Aragon, England, Maximilian I and Pope Alexander VI. He engendered such confidence in Maximilian and Alexander that they both also gave him power to negotiate on their behalf on 15 November 1495 and 18 April 1496. Suspicions from his previous time in London persisted in Aragon, however, and another joint ambassador to England and Scotland was sent in the form of Pedro de Ayala. He and de Puebla proved incompatible, leading to friction and fears from de Puebla that his role was being diminished. This intensified when Ferdinand and Isabella sent yet more emissaries to London, namely Gutierre Gómez de Fuensalida in 1500 and Hernán Duque de Estrada two years later, with the former even secretly granted the power to dismiss de Puebla as ambassador.

By this time Catharine had been widowed and de Puebla began negotiations for her re-marriage to Arthur's younger brother, the future Henry VIII of England, in an attempt to maintain the Anglo-Spanish alliance and continue their isolation of France. Fuensalida intervened and the marriage was delayed until 1508. De Puebla seems to have been both criticised and praised by Henry VII, praising him in a letter to Don Fernando when a replacement for de Puebla was being considered and recommending he either be made a bishop in England or married off to a rich heiress. de Puebla himself, however, instead asked Henry for a life pension for the same amount as his salary. His second embassy ended on 21 June 1508 on Ferdinand's orders, delivered by Fuensalida, though de Puebla stayed in England until his death in April the following year. His only child, Gonzalo, became chaplain to Charles V, Holy Roman Emperor.

Depictions in popular culture
The Six Wives of Henry VIII (1970) - Ken Wynne
The Shadow of the Tower (1972) - John Bennett
Princes in the Tower (2005) - Nicholas Rowe
Six Tudor Queens. Katherine of Aragon The True Queen (2016) Alison Weir The White Princess'' (2017) - Philip Arditti

References

Ambassadors of Spain to England
1450 births
1509 deaths
Year of birth uncertain
People from Toledo, Spain